Shui Cham Tsui Pai is an uninhabited island in North District, Hong Kong. It is located in Starling Inlet, within the Frontier Closed Area.

Uninhabited islands of Hong Kong
North District, Hong Kong
Islands of Hong Kong